Tominian Cercle is an administrative subdivision of the Ségou Region of Mali. The administrative center of the local government is in the town of Tominian. The Cercle is divided into Communes, and below this, quarters/villages. In the 2009 census the cercle had a population of 219,853 people.

The cercle of Tominian is divided into 11 communes:
 Benena
 Diora
 Fangasso
 Koula
 Lanfiala
 Mandiakuy
 Mafouné
 Ouan
 Sanekuy
 Timissa
 Tominian
 Yasso

References

Cercles of Mali
Ségou Region